USS Ono has been the name of more than one United States Navy ship, and may refer to:

 , a patrol boat in commission from 1917 to 1919
 , proposed submarine for which the construction contract was cancelled in 1944

United States Navy ship names